Jacob Axelsson Lindblom (27 July 1746 – 15 February 1819) was a Swedish scholar and professor who became Archbishop of Uppsala, a position he held between 1805–1819.

Biography
Axelsson Lindblom was born at Skeda in Östergötland, the son of a clergyman. He received his secondary education at Linköping gymnasium and matriculated at Uppsala University in 1763. He became  student of the philologist Johan Ihre and the Latinist  Petrus Ekerman (1696–1783) who was also inspector of the student society Östgöta nation (Uppsala).

He worked as a tutor for a noble family in Livonia 1764–1766, came back to Uppsala where he completed his magister degree in 1770. After having worked as a docent and a librarian at the university library, he became an extraordinary professor in 1779 and was appointed to the Skyttean professorship of Eloquence and Political Science in 1781, after the death of his teacher Johan Ihre. Axelsson Lindblom published a History of Roman Literature (Illustriores linguæ Romanæ critici) and collaborated with Ihre on a Lexicon Latino-Svecanum, which he was eventually to complete in 1790. He published prolifically historical, literary and other topics, but is not regarded as particularly original in his scholarly production.

Axelsson Lindblom was a favorite of King Gustavus III, who made him Bishop of Linköping in December 1786, nor withstanding the fact he had never been ordained, a situation remedied a few days after the appointment. As bishop he succeeded Uno von Troil, who had been made Archbishop of Uppsala, and in 1805 he succeeded von Troil as archbishop of Uppsala as well, an appointment which also made him Pro-Chancellor of the University.

He was elected a member of the Swedish Academy in 1809, and was awarded a knighthood in the Order of Seraphim in 1818. His children were raised to the nobility with a change of surname to Lindersköld.

References

Other sources
Nordisk familjebok, vol. 16 (1912), col. 588f (in Swedish)

1746 births
1819 deaths
18th-century Lutheran bishops
19th-century Lutheran archbishops
Lutheran archbishops of Uppsala
Lutheran bishops of Linköping
Members of the Swedish Academy
Age of Liberty people